In Greek mythology, Phegeus (Ancient Greek: Φηγεύς) was the name of the following characters:
 Phegeus, another name for Aegialeus, son of Inachus and king of Sicyon.
Phegeus, king of Psophis.
 Phegeus, was one of the Thebans who ambushed Tydeus during the war of the Seven against Thebes. Like others participating in this ambush he was killed by Tydeus.
 Phegeus, a defender of Thebes in the war of the Seven against Thebes. He was killed by Agreus.
 Phegeus, an Athenian messenger whom Theseus sent to Creon with a threat of war against Thebes, if Creon would not let the bodies of those who had died attacking Thebes in the war of the Seven against Thebes be burned.
 Phegeus, son of Dares, priest of Hephaestus at Troy. He was the brother of Idaeus and was killed by Diomedes during the Trojan War.
 Phegeus, one of Aeneas' companions in Italy. He was killed by Turnus, the man who opposed Aeneas in Italy.
 Phegeus, soldier in the army of Aeneas. He was killed by Turnus, the man who opposed Aeneas in Italy.

Notes

References 

 Apollodorus, The Library with an English Translation by Sir James George Frazer, F.B.A., F.R.S. in 2 Volumes, Cambridge, MA, Harvard University Press; London, William Heinemann Ltd. 1921. ISBN 0-674-99135-4. Online version at the Perseus Digital Library. Greek text available from the same website.
 Homer, The Iliad with an English Translation by A.T. Murray, Ph.D. in two volumes. Cambridge, MA., Harvard University Press; London, William Heinemann, Ltd. 1924. . Online version at the Perseus Digital Library.
 Homer, Homeri Opera in five volumes. Oxford, Oxford University Press. 1920. . Greek text available at the Perseus Digital Library.
 Publius Papinius Statius, The Thebaid translated by John Henry Mozley. Loeb Classical Library Volumes. Cambridge, MA, Harvard University Press; London, William Heinemann Ltd. 1928. Online version at the Topos Text Project.
 Publius Papinius Statius, The Thebaid. Vol I-II. John Henry Mozley. London: William Heinemann; New York: G.P. Putnam's Sons. 1928. Latin text available at the Perseus Digital Library.
 Publius Vergilius Maro, Aeneid. Theodore C. Williams. trans. Boston. Houghton Mifflin Co. 1910. Online version at the Perseus Digital Library.
 Publius Vergilius Maro, Bucolics, Aeneid, and Georgics. J. B. Greenough. Boston. Ginn & Co. 1900. Latin text available at the Perseus Digital Library.

Trojans
People of the Trojan War
Characters in the Aeneid
Characters in Seven against Thebes
Argive characters in Greek mythology
Attican characters in Greek mythology
Theban characters in Greek mythology
Theseus
Mythology of Argolis
Mythology of Sicyon